Hyde is a town in Tameside, Greater Manchester, England.  The town and the nearby area contains 37 listed buildings that are recorded in the National Heritage List for England.  Of these, one is listed at Grade II*, the middle grade, and the others are at Grade II, the lowest grade.  The listed buildings include houses, farmhouses, farm buildings, churches and associated structures, a public house, a former hatter's workshop, bridges crossing the Peak Forest Canal, a boundary stone, a canal warehouse, a railway viaduct, civic buildings, a former theatre, and war memorials.


Key

Buildings

References

Citations

Sources

Lists of listed buildings in Greater Manchester
Listed